Mikhail Yuryevich Teplinsky (Russian: Михаил Юрьевич Теплинский; born 9 January 1969) is a Russian military officer.  he holds the rank of colonel general and has been commander of the Russian Airborne Forces since June 2022. He was awarded the title Hero of the Russian Federation in 1995.

Biography

Mikhail Teplinsky was born in Mospyne, in what was then the Ukrainian Soviet Socialist Republic, in the Soviet Union, on 9 January 1969. In 1987 he entered and in 1991 graduated from the Ryazan Higher Airborne Command School. He served in the 106th Guards Airborne Division stationed in Tula. He commanded an airborne reconnaissance platoon and a reconnaissance company of the 137th Guards Airborne Regiment. From 1992 to 1993, he took part in the Russian operations in Transnistria. From December 1994 to March 1995 he participated in the First Chechen War. He distinguished himself in battles while crossing the Sunzha River. During the period of hostilities, senior lieutenant Teplinsky had about 30 destroyed militants on his personal combat account. For courage and heroism shown during the performance of a special task, by decree of the President of Russia of 1 March 1995, Senior Lieutenant Teplinsky was awarded the title of Hero of the Russian Federation. While still in Chechnya, he received a promotion in rank and position: he became the captain and head of intelligence of the parachute regiment.

In 1999, Teplinsky graduated from the Combined Arms Academy of the Armed Forces of Russia. He took command of a paratrooper battalion that year, and went on to fight in the Second Chechen War. Transferred to the 76th Guards Airborne Division in Pskov, he was chief of staff and commander of the 234th Guards Airborne Regiment of the Black Sea. He became a Guard Colonel in 2002. In October 2002, he was appointed deputy commander of the 76th Guards Airborne Division, and since 2003 he was its chief of staff.

In 2007, Teplinsky graduated from the Military Academy of the General Staff of the Armed Forces of Russia. In June 2007, he was appointed head of the 212th Guards District Training Center Vienna named after the Hero of the Soviet Union, Lieutenant General I. N. Russiyanov (Siberian Military District, Chita Oblast). Since June 2009, he was the Chief of Staff - 1st Deputy Commander of the 20th Guards Combined Arms Army of the Western Military District in Mulino, Nizhny Novgorod Oblast. Teplinsky was promoted to Guards Major General in 2012.

On 19 February 2013, Teplinsky became the Commanding General of the 36th Combined Arms Army of the Eastern Military District, and became a lieutenant general on 13 December 2014. In May 2015, he was appointed chief of staff of the territorial troops in the Southern Military District.

According to the Main Directorate of Intelligence of the Ministry of Defence of Ukraine, Teplinksy provided support to the armed forces of the self-proclaimed Donetsk and Luhansk People's Republic.

On 14 March 2017, by decree of the President of Russia, Teplinsky was appointed Chief of Staff - First Deputy Commander of the Southern Military District. On 5 April 2019, Teplinsky was appointed Chief of Staff - First Deputy Commanding General of the Central Military District. By Decree of the President of Russia dated in December 2021, Teplinsky was promoted to Colonel General. In June 2022, Teplinksy was appointed commanding general of the Russian Airborne Forces.

Since 13 December 2022, Teplinsky has been under British sanctions.

Family
Teplinsky is married, with two sons and a daughter.

References

1969 births
Living people
Russian military personnel of the 2022 Russian invasion of Ukraine
Russian colonel generals
Heroes of the Russian Federation
Recipients of the Order "For Merit to the Fatherland", 4th class
People from Donetsk Oblast
Recipients of the Order of Courage
Recipients of the Medal of the Order "For Merit to the Fatherland" I class
Recipients of the Medal of the Order "For Merit to the Fatherland" II class
Ryazan Guards Higher Airborne Command School alumni
Military Academy of the General Staff of the Armed Forces of Russia alumni